Eduardo Filipe Quaresma Coimbra Simões (born 2 March 2002) is a Portuguese professional footballer who plays as a centre-back for Bundesliga club TSG 1899 Hoffenheim on loan from Sporting CP.

Club career
Born in Barreiro, Setúbal District, Quaresma joined the youth academy of G.D. Fabril at the age of 3 before moving to Sporting CP in 2011. In May 2020, the club rejected a bid of €5 million and Diego Laxalt from A.C. Milan in exchange for his signature. Inter Milan and RB Leipzig were also interested in him, but he agreed to a new contract to tie him to Sporting until 2025, with a €45 million buyout clause and annual salary of €250,000.

Quaresma made his professional debut in a 2–2 Primeira Liga draw away to Vitória S.C. on 4 June 2020, playing the full game. In the following season, he contributed two appearances (three overall) as his team won the national championship for the first time in 19 years.

On 23 July 2021, Quaresma was loaned to C.D. Tondela for one year without a buying option. He scored his first goal in the Portuguese top flight on 7 January 2022, a late consolation in the 1–3 home loss to S.L. Benfica.

On 4 August 2022, Quaresma joined TSG 1899 Hoffenheim on a season-long loan, with an option to make the move permanent afterwards.

International career
Quaresma earned his first cap for Portugal at under-21 level on 6 September 2021, in a 1–0 victory over Belarus in the 2023 UEFA European Championship qualifiers held in Amadora.

Personal life
Quaresma is a distant relative of Brazilian international Zico.

Honours
Sporting CP
Primeira Liga: 2020–21
Taça da Liga: 2020–21

References

External links

2002 births
Living people
Sportspeople from Barreiro, Portugal
Portuguese footballers
Association football defenders
Primeira Liga players
Campeonato de Portugal (league) players
G.D. Fabril players
Sporting CP footballers
Sporting CP B players
C.D. Tondela players
Bundesliga players
TSG 1899 Hoffenheim players
Portugal youth international footballers
Portugal under-21 international footballers
Portuguese expatriate footballers
Expatriate footballers in Germany
Portuguese expatriate sportspeople in Germany